First-seeded and defending champion Maureen Connolly defeated Doris Hart 6–3, 7–5 in the final to win the women's singles tennis title at the 1952 U.S. National Championships.

Seeds
The tournament used two lists for seeding the women's singles event; one for U.S. players and one for foreign players. Maureen Connolly is the champion; others show in brackets the round in which they were eliminated.

  Maureen Connolly (champion)
  Doris Hart (finalist)
  Shirley Fry (semifinals)
  Louise Brough (semifinals)
  Nancy Kiner (quarterfinals)
  Anita Kanter (third round)

  Thelma Coyne Long (quarterfinals)
  Nelly Adamson (first round) 
  Angela Mortimer (quarterfinals)
  Helen Fletcher (third round)
  Melita Ramírez (first round)
  Sachiko Kamo (first round)

Draw

Key
 Q = Qualifier
 WC = Wild card
 LL = Lucky loser
 r = Retired

Final eight

References

1952
1952 in women's tennis
1952 in American women's sports
Women's Singles